Matías Rodrigo Pérez Marín (born 4 January 1994) is a Paraguayan footballer who plays as a centre back for Sporting B.

References

External links

1994 births
Living people
Paraguayan footballers
Sportspeople from Asunción
Paraguay under-20 international footballers
Paraguay international footballers
Paraguayan Primera División players
Club Nacional footballers
Club Rubio Ñu footballers
Paraguayan expatriate footballers
Expatriate footballers in Portugal
Association football defenders